is a Japanese law passed December 19, 1955. It outlined the basics for the use of nuclear power in Japan.

Overview

Article 1 (Objective)

The objective of this Law should be to secure energy resources in the future, to achieve the progress of science and technology and the promotion of industries by fostering the research, development and utilization of atomic energy and thereby to contribute to the welfare of mankind and to the elevation of the national living standard.

Article 2 (Basic policy)

The research, development and utilization of atomic energy shall be limited to peaceful purposes, aimed at ensuring safety and performed independently under democratic management, the results therefrom shall be made public to contribute to international cooperation. 

Article 3 outlines definitions.
Articles 4-6 create the Japanese Atomic Energy Commission and the Nuclear Safety Commission and outline their basic purpose. 
Article 7: Atomic Energy Development Institutions.  This section created the Japan Atomic Energy Research Institute.
Articles 8-11 Development and Acquisition of Minerals 
Articles 12 and 13 Control over Nuclear Fuel Materials 
Articles 14-16 Control over Reactors 
Articles 17-19 Measures for Patented Inventions 
Article 20 Protection from Radiation Hazards 
Article 21 Compensation

See also
Nuclear power in Japan

External links
English text of the law

Japanese legislation
Nuclear energy in Japan